Erik Riss (born 13 September 1995) is a German speedway and grasstrack rider, who won the World Longtrack Championship in 2014 and 2016, and was German speedway champion in 2016.

Career
Born in Memmingen, Germany, the son of former rider Gerd Riss and younger brother of Mark Riss, Erik Riss began his speedway career in 2012 and rode in his home country for Automobilclub Landshut from 2013, also riding in Germany for MSV Herxheim and AMC Memmingen.

He first had success in long track, winning the German championship in 2014. Later that year, at 19, he became the youngest rider ever to win the world championship. In the same year, he was part of the German teams that won the World Longtrack Team Championship and finished fourth in the European Junior Team Championship.

In 2015, he began his British speedway career in the Premier League with Edinburgh Monarchs, with whom he won the League Cup, Premier League Four-Team Championship, and the Premier League title. In 2016 he won the German Championship and won the World Longtrack Championship for a second time, scoring a 7-ride maximum in the final round in Vechta, and finished in 8th place in the Under-21 World Speedway Championship. While continuing to ride for the Monarchs in the Premier League and then in the newly formed SGB Championship, in 2017 he also signed to ride for Leicester Lions in the SGB Premiership, and was selected to ride for Germany in the 2017 Speedway Best Pairs Championship. In 2019, he signed for Redcar Bears. On 1 September 2019, Riss won his first Championship Riders' title at Sheffield after qualifying for the semi-final on 12 points. He won the semi-final and then went on to win the final. He rounded off 2019 by finishing third in the Jason Crump Classic at Kurri Kurri in Australia.

In 2022, he rode for the Ipswich Witches in the SGB Premiership 2022 and for the Redcar Bears in the SGB Championship 2022. He helped Ipswich win the Premiership Pairs but broke his leg riding for AC Landshut in the Polish League.

In 2023, he re-signed for Ipswich for the SGB Premiership 2023 and also re-signed for Redcar for the SGB Championship 2023.

Speedway German Championship
 2016 - Winner - German Speedway Champion

British Speedway Championship League
 2019 - Winner - SGB Championship Rider's Champion

World Longtrack Championship

Overall standings
 2013 - 1 apps (25th) 4pts
 2014 - 4 apps (First) 77pts
 2015 - 4 apps (Second) 68pts
 2016 - 5 apps (First) 122pts

Best results
  Eenrum Second 2015, Third 2016
  Forssa Second 2016
  Herxheim Third 2014
  Marmande 2014
  Mühldorf First 2016, Second 2014
  Vechta First 2016, Third 2015

Team Championship
 2014  Forssa (First) 45pts (Rode with Enrico Janoschka, Jorg Tebbe, Stephan Katt)
 2015  Mühldorf (Second) 41pts (Rode with Jorg Tebbe, Michael Hartel, Stephan Katt)

References

External links

1995 births
Living people
German speedway riders
Edinburgh Monarchs riders
Ipswich Witches riders
King's Lynn Stars riders
Leicester Lions riders
Redcar Bears riders
Individual Speedway Long Track World Championship riders
People from Memmingen
Sportspeople from Swabia (Bavaria)